Roberto de Oliveira Muniz (born November 23, 1963) is a Brazilian politician. He has represented Bahia in the Federal Senate since 2016. Previously, he was a deputy from Bahia from 2003 to 2011. He is a member of the Progressive Party.

References

Living people
1963 births
Members of the Federal Senate (Brazil)
Progressistas politicians